The red ring disease of coconuts and African oil palms is caused by the nematode Bursaphelenchus cocophilus. It is also identified in literature with an alternative scientific name Rhadinaphelenchus cocophilus. The common name, the red ring nematode, is derived from its distinguishing symptom.

Significance
This nematode can cause losses up to 80% in Elaeis guineensis (oilpalm) plantations, however, the losses typically range from 10 to 15% on coconut palms and oil palms. The most economically severe losses are in coconut, oilpalm, and dates. It and B. xylophilus are the only two economically significant diseases in Bursaphelenchus. B. cocophilus is among the most commonly prohibited and/or inspected-for nematode plant diseases in the world.

Distribution
This nematode is distributed in Central and South America, and some of the islands in the Caribbean.

Hosts
Over 17 of the Palmae, probably over half of them.

Identification
The distinguishing characteristics of this nematode are a well-developed metacorpus from J2 through adult, a short stylet 11-15 μm in adults, adults typically 1mm in length. Females have the vulva located two-thirds body length and have a vulval flap. Females have a long post uterine sac and a rounded tail. Males have seven papillae in the tail region, distinct spicules, and bursa shaped as a spade.

Life cycle
The red ring nematode follows a typical plant parasitic life cycle, having 4 molts before becoming an adult. The whole life cycle lasts approximately ten days. The survival/transmissible stage is the dauer. The survival stage is the J3. The dissemination of this nematode depends on its relationship with its vector.

Insect vector relationship
The vector, Rhynchophorus palmarum (the South American palm weevil), carries the dauer/J3 stage to healthy palms. Female weevils are internally infested around the oviducts, when they lay their eggs in the palm they also disseminate the nematode.

Host-parasite relationship
The symptoms produced by this nematode are chlorosis beginning in the oldest leaves and a distinct red/brownish ring in the trunk of the tree.

Management
To manage this disease scouting is the most important aspect; early detection of infected trees may save plantations. If an infected tree is found it must be removed, treated with herbicide and cut down. Leaving the stump behind can lead to vector reproduction and spread the nematode. Trapping the vector is another strategy, reducing the disease incidence from 10% to 1%.

Footnotes

References
 Blair, G. and Darling, D. (1968). Red ring disease on the coconut palm, inoculation studies and histopathology. Nematologica 14: 395-403.
 CABI/EPPO (1999). Rhadinaphelenchus cocophilus. Distribution Maps of Plant Diseases No. 786. CAB INTERNATIONAL. Wallingford, UK.
 Chinchilla CM. (1991). The red ring little leaf syndrome in oil palm and coconut palm. ASD Oil Palm Papers No. 1, 1-17. https://web.archive.org/web/20090130062423/http://www.asd-cr.com/ASD-Pub/Bol01/b01c1.htm (21 June 2009).
 Esser, R. P. and J.A. Meredith (1987).  Red ring nematode. Fla. Dept. Agric.& Consumer Serv., Div. Plant Ind., Nema. Circ. No. 141.
 Goodey, J Basil (1960). Rhadinaphelenchus cocophilus (Cobb, 1919) N. Comb., The nematode associated with "red-ring" disease of coconut. Nematologica 5:98-102.
 Oehlschlager, A. C., Chinchilla, Carlos, Castillo, Geovani, and Gonzalez, Lilliana (2002). Control of Red Ring Disease by Mass Trapping of Rhynchophorus palmarum (Coleoptera: Curculionidae). The Florida Entomologist 85(3): 507-513.

External links 
 http://entomology.ifas.ufl.edu/creatures/nematode/red_ring_nematode.htm

Aphelenchida
Tree diseases
Pests of oil palm
Coconut palm diseases